The  is a class of six 2-8-4 steam locomotive built by the Japanese National Railways (JNR) in 1960 and 1961. They were redesigned by Hideo Shima and rebuilt at JNR Hamamatsu Works and Kōriyama Works .

The D61 was a rebuild of the JNR Class D51, which had a 2-8-2  wheel arrangement.

List Of Class D61

D61 1 (Rebuilt From D51 640 in 1960 at Hamamatsu Works)

D61 2 (Rebuilt From D51 555 in 1960 at Hamamatsu Works)

D61 3 (Rebuilt From D51 181 in 1960 at Hamamatsu Works)

D61 4 (Rebuilt From D51 224 in 1960 at Hamamatsu Works)

D61 5 (Rebuilt From D51 205 in 1961 at Kōriyama Works)

D61 6 (Rebuilt From D51 519 in 1961 at Kōriyama Works)

Preserved examples
, one Class D61, D61 3, is preserved in a park in Rumoi, Hokkaido.

See also
 Japan Railways locomotive numbering and classification

References

Steam locomotives of Japan
1067 mm gauge locomotives of Japan
2-8-4 locomotives
Railway locomotives introduced in 1960
1′D2′ h2 locomotives
Rebuilt locomotives